The 1936 United States presidential election in Colorado took place on November 3, 1936, as part of the 1936 United States presidential election. Voters chose six representatives, or electors to the Electoral College, who voted for president and vice president.

Colorado voted for the Democratic candidate Franklin D. Roosevelt over Republican candidate Alf Landon. Roosevelt won Colorado by a margin of 23.28%, carrying every county except Elbert, Kit Carson and Rio Blanco.

As of the 2020 presidential election, this is the last occasion when Washington County and Hinsdale County voted for a Democratic Presidential candidate.

Results

Results by county

References

Colorado
1936
1936 Colorado elections